Gerry Mulligan and the Concert Jazz Band on Tour (subtitled Guest Soloist: Zoot Sims) is a live album recorded by American jazz saxophonist and bandleader Gerry Mulligan featuring performances recorded in California, Berlin and Milan 1960 which were released on the Verve label. In the CD era it has been superseded by The Complete Santa Monica Concert

Reception

The Allmusic site awarded the album 4½ stars calling it a "highly recommended album" and stating "Tenor saxophonist Zoot Sims, who had previously toured with Mulligan's sextet and always swings effortlessly, is featured as a special guest on several of the selections".

Track listing
 "Go Home" (Ben Webster) - 7:27
 "Barbara's Theme" (Johnny Mandel) - 5:17
 "I Want to Live" (Mandel) - 6:57
 "Red Door" (Zoot Sims, Gerry Mulligan) - 5:32
 "Come Rain or Come Shine" (Harold Arlen, Johnny Mercer) - 4:41
 "Apple Core" (Mulligan) - 5:05
 "Go Home" (Webster) - 5:40
Recorded at Santa Monica Civic Auditorium, CA on October 1, 1960 (tracks 4, 5 & 7), West Berlin in West Germany on November 4, 1960 (track 3) and the Teatro Lirico in Milan, Italy on November 14, 1960 (tracks 1, 2 & 6)

Personnel
Gerry Mulligan - baritone saxophone
Conte Candoli, Don Ferrara, Nick Travis - trumpet
Willie Dennis - trombone
Alan Raph - bass trombone
Bob Brookmeyer - valve trombone, piano track 4
Bob Donovan - alto saxophone
Gene Quill - alto saxophone, clarinet
Jim Reider, Zoot Sims (full feature on tracks 5 and 6) - tenor saxophone
Gene Allen - baritone saxophone, bass clarinet
Buddy Clark - bass
Mel Lewis - drums
Bill Holman (tracks 1, 6 & 7), Johnny Mandel (tracks 2 & 3), Gerry Mulligan (track 5) - arranger

References

Gerry Mulligan live albums
1962 live albums
Verve Records live albums
Albums arranged by Johnny Mandel